The 2014 season was Washington Spirit's second season of existence in which they competed in the National Women's Soccer League, the top division of women's soccer in the United States.

Review
Coming off a tough inaugural season, the Spirit looked to build a contending team for the 2014 season. Mark Parsons had a full preseason to work with his team and made some key offseason acquisitions included Jodie Taylor and Christine Nairn, both who would finish as the team's tops scorers with 11 and 8 goals, respectively.

The beginning of the season saw similar struggles to 2013, losing 4 of the opening 6 matches. The turn-around began in Week 7, when the Spirit would outscore the Western New York Flash 3–2 with a brace from Jodie Taylor and own goal equalizer. The Spirit went 5 matches unbeaten mid-season and finished the season strong, losing only two of their last ten matches.

Finishing 4th, the Spirit made their first NWSL Playoff appearance. They ultimately lost at Seattle Reign in a 2–1 match with Veronica Perez scoring the Spirit's first ever playoff goal in the 65th minute.

Club

Roster 
As of April 24, 2014: 

 (FP)

 (FP)
 (FP)

 (FP)
 (FP)

 (FP)

 (FP) = Federation player

Team management

Competitions

Preseason

Regular season

Regular-season standings

Results summary

NWSL Playoffs

Squad statistics
Note: only regular season squad statistics displayed.

Key to positions: FW - Forward, MF - Midfielder, DF - Defender, GK - Goalkeeper

Transfers

In

Out

Loan in

Honors and awards

NWSL Yearly Awards

NWSL Team of the Year

See also 
 2014 National Women's Soccer League season

References 

Washington Spirit seasons
Washington Spirit
Washington Spirit
Washington Spirit